Forest pathology is the research of both biotic and abiotic maladies affecting the health of  a forest ecosystem, primarily fungal pathogens and their insect vectors. It is a subfield of forestry and plant pathology.

Forest pathology is part of the broader approach of forest protection.

Insects, diseases and severe weather events damaged about 40 million ha of forests in 2015, mainly in the temperate and boreal domains.

Abiotic factors
There  are a number of abiotic factors which affect the health of a forest, such as moisture issues like drought, winter-drying, waterlogging resulting from over-abundance or lack of precipitation such as hail, snow, rain.

Wind is also an important abiotic factor as windthrow (the uprooting or breaking of trees due to high winds) causes an obvious and direct loss of stability to a forest or its trees.

Often, abiotic factors and biotic factors will affect a forest at the same time. For example, if wind speed is 80 km per hour then many trees which have root rot (caused by a pathogen) are likely to be thrown. Higher wind speeds are necessary to damage healthier trees.

Fire, whether caused by humans or lightning, and related abiotic factors also affect the health of forest.

The effects of man often alter a forest's predisposition to damage from both abiotic and biotic effects. For example, soil properties may be altered by heavy machinery.

Other abiotic factors
Nutrient imbalances: deficiencies, chemicals (toxic salts, herbicides, air pollutants)
Stemflow which can concentrate dry deposits which via soil acidification can kill surrounding plants.
Temperature

Biotic factors

Fungi: Ascomycota, Basidiomycota and Fungi imperfecti
There is a category listing fungal tree pathogens and diseases in Wikipedia.

Oomycota: Phytophthora
Bacteria
Phytoplasmas
Viruses

Insects

There is a category listing insect pests of temperate forests in Wikipedia.

Ips (genus) bark beetles
Bark beetle
Ambrosia beetle
Cerambycidae
Black arches

Some of these factors act in concert (all do to a degree). For example, Amylostereum areolatum is spread by the sirex woodwasp. The fungus gains access to new trees to live off, and the woodwasp larvae gain food.

Parasitic flowering plants
Many plants can parasitize trees via root to root contact. Many of these parasitic plants originate in the tropical and subtropical climates.

Animals
Nematodes, insects especially bark beetles, mammals may browse. Browsing can be prevented with tree shelters.

Humans and other mammals predate on trees, and on unsustainable, especially industrial scales, these are demonstrably pathological to the forest. Additionally, poorly planned but conventionally replanted (post-cut) forest plantations are typically monocropped, and highly susceptible to further insect or fungal infection due to low biodiversity and diminished capacity for community resilience - see the "Wood wide web".

Part of forest pathology is forest entomology. Forest entomology includes the study of all insects and arthropods, such as mites, centipedes and millipedes, which live in and interact in forest ecosystems. Forest entomology also includes the management of insect pests that cause the degrading, defoliation, crown die-back or death of trees.

Thus the scope is wide and includes:

 Documentation of all insect species and related arthropods in natural and man-made forests, and the study and ecology of those species.
 Description and assessment of damage to tree structures (parts of a tree), to forest stands, landscape effects and to wood products, timber in service and other ecosystem services.
 Eradication of recently introduced pests, or long-term management of established exotics and indigenous pests, to minimise losses in wood quality and wood production, and to reduce tree mortality.
 Assessments of forest operations, or of management impacts, on the invertebrate fauna, and the alleviation of any adverse effects on these invertebrates.

Hazard trees 
The likelihood of property damage or personal injury due to tree failure. Hazard includes not only the tree's condition, but the potential target as well. Rating systems, procedures and guidelines have been developed for decision making but knowledge, judgement, and experience are an important part to the process.

Pathogens that affect trees
There is a category listing tree diseases in Wikipedia.

 Armillaria, which causes white rot root disease
 Cenangium
 Hymenoscyphus fraxineus, which causes Ash Dieback
 Heterobasidion annosum, which causes Annosum or red root rot, the economically most significant pathogen in the Northern hemisphere.
 Chestnut blight
 Rickettsia, which causes possibly this citrus greening disease
 Spiroplasma
 Dutch elm disease
 Ink disease
 Emerald ash borer
 Olive tree pathology
 Witch's broom
 White Pine Blister Rust
 Phytophthora cinnamomi, which causes root rot
 Phytophthora ramorum, which causes sudden oak death
 Polypore or bracket fungus
 Tinder conk

Signs and symptoms
Symptoms are a result of a pathogen:

 Blight
 Burl
 Canker
 Chlorosis
 Drunken trees
 Forest dieback
 Gall
 Girdling
 Leaf scorch
 Root rot
 Virescence
 Wilt disease

Signs are the visible presence of a part of a pathogen:

 Ascus is a part of an ascomycota fungus.
 Conk (fungi) is the fruiting body of a bracket fungus.
 Hypha are collectively called a mycelium
 Mycelial cord or rhizomorphs

Pathology detection
This can be done by machines or by dogs smelling the trees, similar to the methods used to find truffles. It can also be done by monitoring and identification can happen via tree clinics, experts such as arborists or even non-experts through citizen science.

It is important to consider the disease triangle when evaluating pathologies. Demonstration of suspected active agents can be done by confirmation of Koch's postulates.

See also
 Allelopathy
 Disease
 Etiology
 Disturbance (ecology)
 Forest IPM
 Glossary of phytopathology
 Lists of invasive species
 Outline of forestry
 Pest (organism)
 Plant disease epidemiology
 Robert Hartig
 Forest Pathology (journal)
 Secondary forest
 Sanitation harvest

Sources

References

Further reading
 Tainter, Frank H., and Fred A. Baker . Principles of Forest Pathology. New York, NY: John Wiley & Sons, Inc., 1996.
 European Journal of Forest Pathology (Eur J Forest Pathol), Springer,  (printed),  (electronic), 1895–present, 5-Year Impact Factor: 2.054

External links
 Forest & Shade Tree Pathology
 Forest pathology team at INRA Nancy, France
 Hazard Trees

 
Tree diseases